Alexander Fraser of Touchfraser and Cowie (died 11 August 1332) was a member of the Scottish nobility who served as the Lord Chamberlain of Scotland and also as the Sheriff of Stirling and Sheriff of Kincardine. He was a descendant of the Clan Fraser members deriving from Oliver Castle. Alexander died at the Battle of Dupplin Moor.

Life
Alexander was the son of Andrew Fraser of Touchfraser and Beatrix le Chen and the grandson of Richard Fraser of Touchfraser. He was the Lord Chamberlain of Scotland between 1325 and 1329.

Lands
On 1 November 1315, the baronial House of Strachan was disinherited by Robert de Bruce, who granted the barony of Strachan to his ardent supporter, Sir Alexander Fraser. King Robert the Bruce also conferred vast lands including the Barony of Cowie, Barony of Cluny and Barony of Kinnaird upon Alexander Fraser, who was his chamberlain at least as late as 1319. The major transport routes over these lands in the Middle Ages were two ancient trackways known as the Elsick Mounth and Causey Mounth.

Family
He married in c.1316 Mary, widow of Sir Nigel Campbell, the daughter of Sir Robert de Brus, 6th Lord of Annandale and Marjorie, Countess of Carrick and had the following known issue:
John of Touchfraser
William of Cowie and Durris

See also
Cowie Castle
Muchalls Castle

Citations

References
 Regesta Regum Scottorum, The Acts of Robert I, v, no. 76. 
 Robert William Billings and John Hill Burton (1901) The Baronial and Ecclesiastical Antiquities of Scotland, Oliver and Boyd
 C. Michael Hogan (2007) Causey Mounth, The Megalithic Portal, editor A. Burnham  
 Lineage of Fraser Family 
 Archibald Watt (1985) Highways and Byways around Kincardineshire, Stonehaven Heritage Society

Kincardineshire
Scottish deaths at the Battle of Dupplin Moor
Signatories to the Declaration of Arbroath
Alexander
1332 deaths
Year of birth unknown